The Mayor of Bilbao is the head of the municipal government of Bilbao, Spain. He presides over the Bilbao City Council.

The current mayor of Bilbao is Juan Mari Aburto since 2015.

Mayors of Bilbao since 1979
This is a list of the mayors of Bilbao since the restoration of democracy in Spain.

Since the Spanish transition to democracy, seven individuals have served as mayors of Bilbao. The longest term was that of Iñaki Azkuna, who served for almost 15 years as mayor until his death. All modern mayors of Bilbao have been members of the Basque Nationalist Party.